Benjamin Weiss (January 26, 1937) is an American neuropharmacologist,  Emeritus Professor of Pharmacology and Physiology at Drexel University College of Medicine. He is best known for his work with cyclic nucleotide phosphodiesterases.  He was the first to propose, based on his experimental work, that selective inhibition of phosphodiesterases which are expressed differentially in all tissues, could be used as a target for drug development. His work is the basis for many marketed and developmental human drugs that selectively inhibit cyclic nucleotide phosphodiesterases.

His investigations on the modulation of adrenergic responses in the pineal gland have resulted in the formation of new concepts that may explain the phenomena of drug tolerance and drug hypersensitivity. He and his laboratory were also instrumental in the development of antisense oligonucleotides and antisense RNA as pharmacological tools to study calmodulin and dopamine receptors, and as pharmacological agents for antisense therapy in brain and other tissue.

Early life and education 
Weiss was born in The Bronx in 1937 and was raised on a chicken farm in New Jersey where his immigrant parents moved in 1946.  Weiss went to Toms River High School, graduating in 1954.  He received his undergraduate degree in Pharmacy in 1958  from the Philadelphia College of Pharmacy and Science (now, University of the Sciences), where he also earned a M.Sc. in 1960 and a Ph.D. in Pharmacology in 1963, under the tutelage of G. Victor Rossi.  From 1963 to 1966 he had a Postdoctoral Fellowship and a Staff Fellowship at the National Heart Institute, National Institute of Health, where he studied under Bernard B. Brodie.  He did further training as a research associate at Columbia University, College of Physicians and Surgeons, with Erminio Costa from 1966 to 1968.

Personal life 

In 1959 Weiss married Joyce Zelnick.  They have three children and five grandchildren.

Scientific career 

From 1968 to 1972 Weiss worked at the National Institute of Mental Health at St Elizabeths Hospital, Washington, D.C., where he held the position of chief of the Section on Neuroendocrinology.  In 1972 he accepted the position of professor of pharmacology at the Medical College of Pennsylvania (MCP), where he held the positions of professor of pharmacology and psychiatry, and chief of the Division of Neuropsychopharmacology.  He was also a visiting scientist at the Mario Negri Institute for Pharmacological Researchin Milan, Italy, and a visiting scientist at the Weizmann Institute of Science in Rehovot, Israel. On retirement in 1999 he became an emeritus professor in the Department of Pharmacology and Psychiatry at MCP.  In 2002, when Drexel University assumed leadership of MCP, he was given the position of professor emeritus in the Department of Pharmacology and Physiology at Drexel University College of Medicine, the position he now holds.

Publications 
Weiss is the editor of two books: (Weiss, Benjamin, ed., Cyclic Nucleotides in Disease[1]), and    Antisense Oligodeoxynucleotides and Antisense RNA: Novel Pharmacological and Therapeutic Agents[2)).  He has also published over 300 scientific articles, reviews and abstracts on his research in   molecular biology and molecular pharmacology.

Research 
Cyclic Nucleotide Phosphodiesterases:

Weiss and co-workers developed rapid phosphodiesterease assays [3, 4], separated different isozymes of phosphodiesterase in various tissues by electrophoretic methods [5,6]and  showed that drugs could  selectively inhibit the several isozymes of phosphodiesterase (link) isozymes. He showed that a single cell type may contain more than one form of phosphodiesterase [6,7] and that different forms of phosphodiesterase could be induced or activated by certain neurohormones(e.g. norepinephrine) [7]and intracellular proteins (e.g. calmodulin) [8,9]. He demonstrated that there are different forms of phosphodiesterase in different tissues including the mammalian brain [5,6]and lung [10].

Weiss was the first to show that phosphodiesterase activity is altered in certain disease states [11, 13, 14, 15,16]and to propose that selective inhibition of phosphodiesterase could be the basis of drug selectivity [17,18,19,20]. Weiss and co-workers did extensive work which demonstrated that certain neuropeptides [21,22], alpha adrenergic antagonists [23]and phenothiazineantipsychotic drugs were potent inhibitors of calmodulin activated enzymes [24,25,26,27,28].

Modulation of Adrenergic Receptor-Linked Adenylate Cyclase System:  Using the pineal gland as a model, Weiss and his colleagues were the first to show that the beta-adrenergic receptor-linked adenylate cyclasesystem is modified chronically by a variety of physiological factors and pharmacological perturbations [reviewed in 29].

Weiss showed additionally that the responses to adrenergic stimuli are also altered by a variety of pharmacological agents that chronically change adrenergic input.  For example, long-term treatment with agents that reduce sympathetic input, like reserpine[37], 6-hydroxydopamine[38], guanethidine[39], and certain phenothiazine antipsychotic drugs [40]all increase the density of beta-adrenergic receptors and increase the responsiveness to adenylate cyclase.  By contrast,  treatment with drugs such as the anti-depressant desmethyimipramine, which increases adrenergic input, reduces the adrenergic receptors [41].These studies show that long-term changes following physiological or pharmacological alterations in adrenergic input may be explained by a common biological principle:  the degree to which an adrenergically innervated structure can be stimulated is inversely related to the degree to which it had been previously stimulated. This hypothesis may provide a biochemical basis for explaining the altered responsiveness of the adrenergic system seen in aging and in males vs. females, and may explain the mechanism for drug supersensitivity and drug tolerance.

Antisense Oligonucleotidesand Antisense RNA:Weiss’ laboratory made discoveries on: 1) The role of calmodulin in neuronal differentiation and proliferation; 2) Behavioral and biochemical correlates of dopamineresponses in brain; 3) Development of antisense oligonucleotides and antisense RNA as pharmacological tools to study calmodulin and dopamine receptors, and as pharmacological agents for gene therapy in brain; and 4) Reversal of dopaminergic supersensitivity: preclinical mechanisms and clinical applications. 6) The studies laid the foundation for the therapeutic use of antisense oligonucleotides and antisense RNA in a variety of disease states.  A number of drugs are currently on the market and many others are in clinical development using the concept of antisense therapy, including in cancer, Huntington's Disease, and other neurological diseases.

Weiss and his group, assisted by  Genoveva Uzunova (Davidkova), who carried out a significant part of the antisense RNA studies in his group, used molecular biological, biochemical, pharmacological, cell biological techniques (cell cultures, fluorescence microscopy), and mouse models, to develop antisense oligonucleotides to the D1 and D2 dopamine receptors. They   showed for the first time that intracerebroventricular (i.c.v.) and intrastriatal injection oligonucleotides targeted to the D1 or D2 dopamine receptor in mouse brain can block the biological effects of the targeted receptor with very high specificity  and, importantly, without inducing receptor supersensitivity, which is a significant drawback to the conventional neuroleptic drugs such as haloperidol[42,43,44].  Therefore, these novel pharmacological agents would not likely induce the debilitating motor side effects resulting from conventional pharmacological agents..

Since the effects of the oligonucleotides are relatively short-lasting (up to 2–3 days) and it is necessary to inject them repeatedly in mouse brain in order to achieve a long-term reduction in the D2 dopamine receptor mRNA and the dopamine receptor protein, and the concomitant long-term blockade of the behaviors modulated by these receptors, Weiss’ group developed a second approach – expression of D2 dopamine antisense RNA in brain by a non-viral plasmid vector. This approach was the first to show that a single intrastriatal injection of D2dopamine receptor antisense RNA (targeted to the long isoform of the murine D2 dopamine receptor) can effectively block D2 dopamine-mediated behaviors for up to one month [45].  Moreover, this did not induce D2 receptor supersensitivity, unlike the conventional neuroleptic haloperidol, which blocks D2 dopamine receptors and several other subtypes of dopamine receptors [46]. These studies opened up the possibility to develop a new gene therapeutic approachto treat neurologic and psychiatric conditions associated with D2 receptor hyperactivity such as chorea and addiction to alcohol [47]. In a broader perspective, a similar gene therapeutic approach targeting other central nervous system (CNS) neuroreceptors and proteins may prove useful for treating other disorders of the CNS . The antisense RNA approach is an alternative to the RNA interference approach. RNA interference.

During this period, the studies of Weiss and his group were also focused on the use of antisense oligonucleotides [48]and antisense RNA expression vectors to calmodulin [49]  ,which is a ubiquitous calcium binding protein in brain encoded by three different genes that give rise to several transcripts. These studies helped to elucidate the essential role of calmodulin in the proliferation and differentiation of nerve cells and suggest a novel approach with the potential for gene therapy of tumors that express high levels of calmodulin, such as gliomas and certain forms of breast cancer.  [50,51].

Honors and awards 

In 2001, Drexel University College of Medicine established a Graduate Student Fellowship in his name. He was named as one of the Top One Thousand Most Quoted Contemporary Scientists in the World. He has received awards from the Numismatic Literary Guild and a medal issued jointly by the Token and Medal Society and the American Israel Numismatic Association.

References 
1. Weiss, B.: Editor, Cyclic Nucleotides in Disease, University Park Press, Baltimore, MD. 1975.

2. Weiss, B.: Editor: Antisense Oligodeoxynucleotides and Antisense RNA: Novel Pharmacological and Therapeutic Agents CRC Press, Boca Raton, FL. 1997.

3.Weiss B, Lehne R, Strada S. Rapid microassay of adenosine 3',5'-monophosphate phosphodiesterase activity. Anal Biochem. 1972 Jan;45(1):222-35. .

4. Fertel R, Weiss B.: A microassay for guanosine 3',5'-monophosphate phosphodiesterase activity. Anal Biochem. 1974 Jun;59(2):386-98. .

5. Uzunov, P. and Weiss, B.: Separation of multiple molecular forms of cyclic adenosine 3',5'‑monophosphate phosphodiesterase in rat cerebellum by polyacrylamide gel electrophoresis. Biochim. Biophys. Acta 284:220‑226, 1972. PMID 4342220

6. Uzunov, P., Shein, H.M. and Weiss, B.: Multiple forms of cyclic 3',5'‑AMP phosphodiesterase of rat cerebrum and cloned astrocytoma and neuroblastoma cells. Neuropharmacology 13:377‑391, 1974. PMID 4370207

7. Uzunov, P., Shein, H.M. and Weiss, B.: Cyclic AMP phosphodiesterase in cloned astrocytoma cells: norepinephrine induces a specific enzyme form. Science 180:304‑306, 1973. PMID 4349509.

8. Weiss, B., Prozialeck, W., Cimino, M., Barnette, M.S. and Wallace, T.L.: Pharmacological regulation of calmodulin. In: Calmodulin and Cell Functions, Ann. N.Y. Acad. Sci. 356:319‑345, 1980. PMID 6112947

9. Weiss, B., Prozialeck, W.C. and Wallace, T.L.: Interaction of drugs with calmodulin: Biochemical, pharmacological and clinical implications. Biochem. Pharmacol. 31:2217‑2226, 1982. PMID 6127079

10. Fertel, R. and Weiss, B.: Properties and drug responsiveness of cyclic nucleotide phosphodiesterases of rat lung. Mol. Pharmacol. 12:678‑687, 1976. PMID 183099. Hait, W.N. and Weiss, B.: Increased cyclic nucleotide phosphodiesterase activity in leukemic lymphocytes. Nature 259:321‑323, 1976. PMID 183099

11. Hait, W.N. and Weiss, B.: Characteristics of the cyclic nucleotide phosphodiesterases of normal and leukemic lymphocytes. Biochim. Biophys. Acta 497:86‑100, 1977. PMID 14711

12. Hait, W.N. and Weiss, B.: Increased cyclic nucleotide phosphodiesterase activity in leukemic lymphocytes. Nature 259:321‑323, 1976. PMID 175284

13. Levin, R.M. and Weiss, B.: Characteristics of the cyclic nucleotide phosphodiesterases in a transplantable pheochromocytoma and adrenal medulla of the rat. Cancer Res. 38:915‑920, 1978.

14. Weiss, B. and Winchurch, R.A.: Analyses of cyclic nucleotide phosphodiesterases in lymphocytes from normal and aged leukemic mice. Cancer Res. 38:1274‑1280, 1978.

15. Winchurch, R., Hait, W. and Weiss, B.: Cyclic AMP phosphodiesterase activity of murine T and

B lymphocytes. Cell. Immunol. 41:421‑426, 1978.

16. Hait, W.N. and Weiss, B.: Cyclic nucleotide phosphodiesterase of normal and leukemic lymphocytes: kinetic properties and selective alteration of the activity of the multiple molecular forms. Mol. Pharmacol. 16:851‑864, 1979.

17. Levin, R.M. and Weiss, B.: Mechanism by which psychotropic drugs inhibit adenosine cyclic 3',5'‑monophosphate phosphodiesterase of brain. Mol. Pharmacol. 12:581‑589, 1976.

18. Levin, R.M. and Weiss, B.: Binding of trifluoperazine to the calcium‑dependent activator of cyclic nucleotide phosphodiesterase. Mol. Pharmacol. 13:690‑697, 1977. (a)

19. Levin, R.M. and Weiss, B.: Selective binding of antipsychotics and other psychoactive agents to the calcium‑dependent activator of cyclic nucleotide phosphodiesterase. J. Pharmacol. Exp. Ther. 208:454‑459, 1979.

20. Levin, R.M. and Weiss, B.: Specificity of the binding of trifluoperazine to the calcium‑dependent activator of phosphodiesterase and to a series of other calcium‑binding proteins. Biochim. Biophys. Acta 540:197‑204, 1978. (b)

21. Sellinger‑Barnette, M. and Weiss, B.: Interaction of beta‑endorphin and other opioid peptides with calmodulin. Mol. Pharmacol. 21:86‑91, 1982.

22. Barnette, M.S. and Weiss, B.: Interaction of neuropeptides with calmodulin. A structure‑activity study. Psychopharmacol. Bull., 19:387‑392, 1983.

23. Earl CQ, Prozialeck WC, Weiss B.: Interaction of alpha adrenergic antagonists with calmodulin. Life Sci. 1984 Jul 30;35(5):525-34. .

24. Weiss, B. and Hait, W.N.: Selective cyclic nucleotide phosphodiesterase inhibitors as potential therapeutic agents. Ann. Rev. Pharmacol. Toxicol. 17:441‑477, 1977.

25. Weiss, B. and Levin, R.M.: Mechanism for selectively inhibiting the activation of cyclic nucleotide phosphodiesterase and adenylate cyclase by antipsychotic agents. Adv. Cycl. Nucl. Res. 9:285‑304, 1978.

26. Prozialeck, W.C. and Weiss, B.: Inhibition of calmodulin by phenothiazines and related drugs; structure‑activity relationships. J. Pharmacol. Exptl. Therap. 222:509‑516, 1982.

27. Weiss, B., Earl, C. and Prozialeck, W.C.: Biochemical and possible neuropsychopharmacological implications of inhibiting calmodulin activity. Psychopharmacol. Bull., 19:378‑386, 1983.

28. Weiss, B., Prozialeck, W.C. and Roberts‑Lewis, J.M.: Development of selective inhibitors of calmodulin‑dependent phosphodiesterase and adenylate cyclase; in Design of Enzyme Inhibitors as Drugs, ed. M. Sandler and H.J. Smith, Oxford University Press, New York, pp. 650‑697, 1989.

29. Weiss, B., Greenberg, L.H. and Clark, M.B.: Physiological and pharmacological modulation of the beta-adrenergic receptor-linked adenylate cyclase system: supersensitivity and subsensitivity. In: Dynamics of Neurotransmitter Function, ed. I. Hanin, Raven Press, New York, pp. 319–330, 1984.

30. Weiss, B. and Costa, E.: Adenyl Cyclase activity in rat pineal gland: Effects of chronic denervation and norepinephrine. Science 156:1750-1752, 1967.

31. Strada, S.J. and Weiss, B.: Increased response to catecholamines of the cyclic AMP system of rat pineal gland induced by decreased sympathetic activity. Arch. Biochem. Biophys. 160:197- 204, 1974.

32. Weiss, B.: Effects of environmental lighting and chronic denervation on the activation of adenyl cyclase of rat pineal gland by norepinephrine and sodium fluoride. J. Pharmacol. Exp. Ther. 168:146-152, 1969.

33. Weiss, B. and Crayton, J.: Gonadal hormones as regulators of pineal adenyl cyclase activity. Endocrinology 87:527-533, 1970.

34. Greenberg, L.H., Dix, R.K. and Weiss, B.: Age-related changes in the binding of dihydroalprenolol in rat brain. In: Pharmacological Intervention in the Aging Process, eds. J. Roberts, R.C. Adelman and V.J. Cristofalo, Plenum Press, New York, pp. 245–249, 1978.

35. Greenberg, L.H. and Weiss, B.: Beta adrenergic receptors in aged rat brain: reduced number and capacity of pineal gland to develop supersensitivity. Science 201:61-63, 1978.

36. Weiss, B., Greenberg, L.H. and Cantor, E.: Denervation supersensitivity and beta-adrenergic receptors as a function of age. In: Receptors for Neurotransmitters and Peptide Hormones, eds. G. Pepeu, M.J. Kuhar and S.J. Enna, Raven Press, New York, p 461–472, 1980.

37. Greenberg, L.H. and Weiss, B.: Ability of aged rats to alter beta-adrenergic receptors of brain in response to repeated administration of reserpine and desmethylimipramine. J. Pharmacol. Exp. Ther. 211:309-316, 1979.

38. Strada, S.J., Uzunov, P. and Weiss, B.: Increased sensitivity to norepinephrine (NE) of the cyclic 3',5'-AMP (cAMP) system of rat brain following 6-hydroxydopamine (6-HDM). Pharmacologist 13:257, 1971.

39. Glaubiger, G., Tsai, B.S., Lefkowitz, R.J., Johnson, E.M., Jr. and Weiss, B.: Chronic guanethidine treatment increases cardiac beta-adrenergic receptors. Nature 273:240-242, 1978.

40. Weiss, B. and Greenberg, L.H.: Modulation of beta-adrenergic receptors and calmodulin following acute and chronic treatment with neuroleptics. In: Adv. Biochem. Psychopharmacol., Vol. 24 - Long-Term Effects of Neuroleptics, eds. F. Cattabeni, G. Racagni, P.F. Spano and E. Costa, Raven Press, New York, pp. 139–146, 1980.

41. Moyer, J.A., Greenberg, L.H., Frazer, A., Brunswick, D.J., Mendels, J. and Weiss, B.: Opposite effects of acute and repeated administration of desmethylimipramine on adrenergic responsiveness in rat pineal gland. Life Sci. 24:2237-2244, 1979.

42. Weiss, Benjamin; Long-Wu, Zhou; Zhang, Sui-Po; Qin Z-H. (1993). “Antisense oligodeoxynucleotide inhibits D2 dopamine receptor-mediated behavior and D2 messenger RNA” Neuroscience55(3): 607–612. https:// doi:10.1016/0306-4522(93)90426-G 

43. Zhang, Sui-Po; Long-Wu, Zhou; Weiss, Benjamin (1994). “Oligodeoxynucleotide to the D1 dopamine receptor mRNA inhibits D1 dopamine receptor-mediated behaviors in normal mice and in mice lesioned with 6-hydroxydopamine” J. Pharmacol. Experimental Ther.271(3): 1462- 1470. 

44. Weiss, Benjamin; Zhang, Sui-Po; Zhou, Long-Wu (1997) “Antisense strategies in dopamine receptor pharmacology” Life Sciences60(7): 433–455. doi:10.1016/S0024-3205(96)00566-8 

45. Weiss, Benjamin; Davidkova, Genoveva; Zhou, Long-Wu, Zhang, Sui-Po, Morabito, Mark (1997). “Expression of a D2 dopamine receptor antisense RNA in brain inhibits D2-mediated behaviors” Neurochemistry International31(4): 571–580. doi:10.1016/S0197-0186(97)00025-9 

46. Davidkova, Genoveva; Zhou, Long-Wu; Morabito, Mark; Zhang, Sui-Po; Weiss, Benjamin (1998). “D2 dopamine antisense RNA expression vector, unlike haloperidol, produces long-term inhibition of D2 dopamine-mediated behaviors without causing up-regulation of D2 dopamine receptors” J. Pharmacol. Exper. Therapeutics 285(3): 1187–1196. 

47. Weiss, Benjamin; Davidkova, Genoveva; Zhou, Long-Wu (1999).”Antisense RNA gene therapy for studying and modulating biological processes” Cell Mol. Life Sci.55(3): 334–358. doi:10.1007/s000180050296 

48. Hou, Wang-Fang; Zhang, Sui-Po; Davidkova, Genoveva; Nichols, Robert; Weiss, Benjamin (1998) “Effects on antisense oligonucleotides directed to individual calmodulin gene transcripts on the proliferation and differentiation of PC12 cells” Antisense Nucleic Acids Drug Dev. 8(4): 295–308. doi:10.1089/oli.1.1998.8.295 

49. Davidkova, Genoveva; Zhang, Sui-Po; Nichols, Robert; Weiss, Benjamin (1996) “Reduced level of calmodulin in PC12 cells induced by stable expression of calmodulin antisense RNA inhibits cell proliferation and induces neurite outgrowth” Neuroscience75(4): 1003–1019. doi:10.1016/0306-4522(96)00230-8 

50. Hait, W.N. and Lazo, J.S.: Calmodulin: a potential target for cancer chemotherapeutic agents. J. Clin. Oncol. 4:994-1012, 1986.

51. Mayur, Y.C., Jagadeesh, S. and Thimmaiah, K.N.: Targeting calmodulin in reversing multi drug resistance in cancer cells. Mini Rev. Med. Chem. 6:1383-1389, 2006.

1937 births
Living people
Neuropharmacologists
Drexel University faculty
University of the Sciences alumni
People from the Bronx
American pharmacologists